People's Multiparty Democracy (abbreviated ) refers to the ideological line of the Communist Party of Nepal (Unified Marxist–Leninist) (CPN-UML), Unified Socialist Party and the former Nepal Communist Party. It was proclaimed in 1993. These thoughts abandon the traditional Leninist idea of a revolutionary communist vanguard party in favor of a democratic multi-party system. It is considered an extension of Marxism–Leninism by Madan Bhandari, the CPN-UML leader who developed it, and is based on the home-ground politics of Nepal.

During the merger of CPN(UML) and the Unified Communist Party of Nepal (Maoist Centre) into the Nepal Communist Party, the party line of the united party was provisionally defined as 'People's Democracy' as a compromise between the People's Multiparty Democracy line of the erstwhile CPN(UML) and the '21st Century Democracy' line of the erstwhile UCPN(M). The Nepal Communist Party was later dissolved due to a court ruling.

See also 
 Marxism–Leninism–Maoism–Prachanda Path

References 

Communist Party of Nepal (Unified Marxist–Leninist)
Nepal Communist Party
Nepalese democracy movements
Social democracy
Democratic socialism
1993 establishments in Nepal